José Luis Torres Torres (born 4 August 1994) is a Uruguayan footballer who plays as a midfielder. He is currently a free agent.

Career
Torres' senior career started with Plaza Colonia. He made his professional debut in a Uruguayan Segunda División match with Deportivo Maldonado on 12 October 2013, prior to netting his first goals in a 3–1 win over Progreso in the following November. Torres remained for both the 2013–14 and 2014–15 seasons, before departing in November 2015 to Progreso. He was sent off in his penultimate appearance against Huracán on 21 May 2016. Two months later, on 13 July, Torres joined Nicaraguan Primera División side Juventus. He returned to Uruguay in 2017, rejoining Plaza Colonia. Torres left at the end of 2018 after nine appearances.

Career statistics
.

References

External links

1994 births
Living people
People from Colonia Department
Uruguayan footballers
Association football midfielders
Uruguayan expatriate footballers
Expatriate footballers in Nicaragua
Uruguayan expatriate sportspeople in Nicaragua
Uruguayan Segunda División players
Plaza Colonia players
C.A. Progreso players
Juventus Managua players